Kenneth Kokin (Ken Kokin) is an American film producer, director and executive.

Production

Kokin produced The Usual Suspects, Mortdecai, The Way of the Gun, "Forbidden Kiss" in Chengdu, China and Captain Abu Raed the Sundance Audience Award Winner in festival’s World Dramatic Competition. This was the first independent film produced in Kingdom of Jordan. His film Public Access, directed by Bryan Singer, won the Sundance Grand Jury Prize.

As an executive Kokin worked for several years heading production and development for Perfect World Pictures.

Directed

Kokin produced and directed the documentary For Tomorrow in Argentina which was an official selection for the Tribeca Film Festival and the Newport Beach Film Festival where he won the Humanitarian Vision Award.  This groundbreaking documentary premiered in 10 film festivals and won many other awards and created awareness for Toms Shoes

He directed "Blood Moon" - Starring James Callis, Maya Kazan, and Frank Medrano directed by Nicholas Kazan.

He directed documentaries in South America, Haiti, and Africa about the pandemic of poverty and/ HIV facing children in those regions.

Education
University of Southern California Cinema

Trivia

Kokin joined the Editor’s Guild and worked at both NBC and Amblin Entertainment. CBS hired Kokin to shoot, edit and direct the behind the scenes for the longest-running annual special, Circus of the Stars where he worked with lions, tigers, motorcycle, stunts, high-wire, and trapeze acts.

References

External links

http://about.me/kenkokin

USC School of Cinematic Arts alumni
American filmmakers
Living people
Year of birth missing (living people)